The 1928–29 FA Cup was the 54th season of the world's oldest football cup competition, the Football Association Challenge Cup, commonly known as the FA Cup. Bolton Wanderers won the competition for the third time, beating Portsmouth 2–0 in the final at Wembley.

Matches were scheduled to be played at the stadium of the team named first on the date specified for each round, which was always a Saturday. Some matches, however, might be rescheduled for other days if there were clashes with games for other competitions or the weather was inclement. If scores were level after 90 minutes had been played, a replay would take place at the stadium of the second-named team later the same week. If the replayed match was drawn further replays would be held until a winner was determined. If scores were level after 90 minutes had been played in a replay, a 30-minute period of extra time would be played.

Calendar

First round proper
At this stage 41 clubs from the Football League Third Division North and South joined the 25 non-league clubs who came through the qualifying rounds. Of those Third Division sides not playing in the First Round Proper, Northampton Town and Swindon Town were given a bye to the Third Round, while Nelson were not involved at any stage of the competition. To make the number of matches up, non-league Northfleet United and Leyton were given byes to this round. 34 matches were scheduled to be played on Saturday, 24 November 1928. One match was drawn and went to a replay in the following midweek fixture.

Second round proper
The matches were played on Saturday, 8 December 1928. Two matches were drawn, with replays taking place in the following midweek fixture.

Third round proper
The 44 First and Second Division clubs, entered the competition at this stage, along with Third Division Northampton Town and Swindon Town. Also given a bye to this round of the draw were amateur side Corinthian. The matches were scheduled for Saturday, 12 January 1929. Eight matches were drawn and went to replays in the following midweek fixture, of which one went to a second replay.

Fourth round proper
The matches were scheduled for Saturday, 26 January 1929. Five games were drawn and went to replays in the following midweek fixture.

Fifth Round Proper
The matches were scheduled for Saturday, 16 February 1929. There were three replays played in the next midweek fixture.

Sixth Round Proper
The four quarter-final ties were scheduled to be played on Saturday, 2 March 1929. There were two replays.

Semi-finals
The semi-final matches were played on Saturday, 23 March 1929. Bolton Wanderers and Portsmouth won their matches to meet in the final at Wembley.

Final

The 1929 FA Cup Final was contested by Bolton Wanderers and Portsmouth at Wembley. Bolton won 2–0, with goals by Billy Butler and Harry Blackmore.

Match details

See also
FA Cup Final Results 1872-

References
General
Official site; fixtures and results service at TheFA.com
1928-29 FA Cup at rssf.com
1928-29 FA Cup at soccerbase.com

Specific

FA Cup seasons
Fa Cup, 1928-29
Cup